The 2011 Canton Cougars season was the 1st and only season for the Ultimate Indoor Football League (UIFL) franchise. The Cougars were formed by the head of the Ultimate Indoor Football League, Andrew Haines. Haines made the hire of Rashan Hall to become the Cougars first ever head coach. The Cougars played their first ever game on February 20, 2011 against the Huntington Hammer, a game in which the Cougars lost 41-26. With the team getting off to a rough 0-3 start, Haines issued a guarantee to the people of Canton, saying that the revamped Cougars roster would defeat the Saginaw Sting during their week 4 meeting. The Cougars didn't make their owner a liar, defeating the Sting 53-52. Their victory over the Sting proved to be the lone bright spot for the Cougars, who would lose 9 straight before firing Hall, and replacing him with Paul Farrah. Farrah would lose the game, with less than a week to prepare. The Cougars finished with a 1-13 record, and finished last in the UIFL.

On June 16, 2011, it was announced that Michael Taylor and Andrew Hines had sold their controlling state in the Cougars to Tim Clark. Clark was the former owner of the Johnstown Generals, but the commute was becoming a hassle. Once he gained ownership, he made several personnel changes including, naming Paul Farrah as its new head coach. Farrah was recently hired as the director of football operations. He also hired Canton South High School head coach Mo Daniska as the new defensive coordinator, while Louisville High School defensive coordinator Troy Davis will serve as the Director of Community Relations, focusing on developing youth football camps and clinics. Former Head Coach Rashaun Hall has been retained as an assistant coach and will also serve as director of player personnel. The new group made plenty of signings for the 2012 season, and lasted until January when the franchise suspended operations.

Schedule
Key:

Regular season
All start times are local to home team

Standings

Final roster

References

Canton Cougars
Canton Cougars
2011 in sports in Ohio